Damian Robert Nesta "Jr. Gong" Marley (born 21 July 1978) is a Jamaican DJ, singer, lyricist and rapper. He is the recipient of four Grammy Awards.

Early life, education and family
Damian Marley is the youngest son of reggae musician Bob Marley. He is the only child born to Marley and Cindy Breakspeare, a Jamaican jazz singer and crowned Miss World 1976. Like several of Bob Marley’s children, Damian was born out of wedlock and outside of Bob’s marriage to singer Rita Marley. After seeing the movie Damien: Omen II, which is about the coming of the Antichrist, one of Bob's last requests in Germany was to have Damian's name changed. "Damien being a devil...It was inappropriate for him as a Rastafarian to have a child with that name," Bob said and Damian's name was later changed.

Damian was two years old when his father died. His nickname "Junior Gong" is derived from his father's nickname of "Tuff Gong".

Career

Early releases (1992–2004)
At the age of 13, he formed a musical group by the name of the Shephards, which included the daughter of Freddie McGregor and son of Third World's Cat Coore. The group opened the 1992 Reggae Sunsplash festival. The band fell apart in the early 1990s, and Damian started his solo career.

With the backing of his father's label, Tuff Gong, he released his 1996 debut album Mr. Marley, which surprised many who were unaccustomed to hearing a Marley deejaying rather than singing.
Marley released his second studio album Halfway Tree. The name "Halfway Tree" comes from his mother Cindy Breakspeare being from the rich part of town, and his father Bob Marley coming from the poor part of town, thus him being "a tree halfway in between the 'rich' world and 'poor' world." Additionally, Halfway Tree is a well-known landmark that marks the cultural center of Half-Way-Tree, the clock tower that stands where the historical eponymous cotton tree once stood is featured prominently behind Marley on the cover of the album. The album was released on 11 September 2001 and received the 2002 Grammy Award for Best Reggae Album. It was co-produced by Damian Marley and his brother Stephen Marley, who had also produced Damian's debut album Mr. Marley.

Welcome to Jamrock (2005)

Marley released his third studio album Welcome to Jamrock which was released on 12 September 2005 in the United States and 13 September 2005 in the United Kingdom. The album sold 86,000 copies in its first week of release, and was eventually certified gold after selling 500,000 copies in the United States. 

Damian's half-brother, Stephen Marley, was a producer and co-writer of the hugely successful song of the same name. The lyrics to the single "Welcome to Jamrock", which was performed over a riddim produced by Sly and Robbie for Ini Kamoze some 20 years earlier, centred around poverty, politics and crime in Jamaica. While the single was controversial at home over its perceived negative viewpoint of the island, many praised the content of the song. Dr Clinton Hutton, professor at the University of the West Indies, said of the single: "'Jamrock' uses the icon of the inner city, of alienation, of despair, of prejudice, but of hope, of Jamaican identity, to remind us of the fire of frustration, the fire of creativity, the fire of warning to open up our eyes and look within to the life we are living. And still some of us don't want to hear and to look and say enough is enough." The single reached number 13 on the UK Singles Chart and number 55 on the US Billboard Hot 100 chart. It was also number 100 on the Top 100 Songs of the Decade listing by Rolling Stone.

Other notable singles from the album include "The Master Has Come Back", "Road to Zion" featuring Nas, and "Khaki Suit" featuring Bounty Killer and Eek-A-Mouse.

Distant Relatives (2006–2010)

At the 2006 Grammy Awards, he won Best Reggae Album and Best Urban/Alternative Performance for Welcome to Jamrock. He is the only Jamaican reggae artist in history to win two Grammy Awards on the same night. He is also the only reggae artist to win in the Best Urban/Alternative Performance category at the Grammy Awards.
In 2008, he made an appearance on singer Mariah Carey’s E=MC² album as a featured artist on the album track “Cruise Control”. At the 2009 Grammy Awards news of a collaborative album between Marley and Nas was announced, when Nas told MTV reporters "Right now, I'll tell you first, I'm working on an album with Damian Marley. We tryin' to build some schools in Africa with this one, and trying to build empowerment. We're tryin' to show love and stuff with this album. So, the record's ... all about really the 'hood and Africa also as well."

On 17 May 2010, Marley released Distant Relatives, a collaborative album with Nas. The album title refers not only to the bond between the artists but the connection to their African ancestry, which inspired the album both musically and lyrically. They have previously collaborated on "Road to Zion", on Marley's Welcome to Jamrock album. The album joins two different flavours of music with Marley's dub-rock aesthetic and Nas' flow. Damian and Stephen produced much of the album. The proceeds of this album will go to building schools in the Congo.

The album debuted at number five on the US Billboard 200 chart with first-week sales of 57,000 copies. It serves as Nas's tenth top-ten album and Marley's second top-ten album in the United States. The album also entered at number four on Billboards Digital Albums, and at number one on its R&B/Hip-Hop Albums, Rap Albums, and Reggae Albums charts.
Internationally, Distant Relatives attained some chart success. It entered at number 33 on the European Top 100 Albums chart. In the United Kingdom, it debuted at number 30 on the UK Albums Chart and at number four on the R&B Albums Chart. In Canada, the album entered at number 9 on the Top 100 Albums chart. In Germany, it debuted at number 38 on the Media Control Charts.

The first single, "As We Enter", was released on iTunes on 23 February 2010. It peaked at number 10 on the iTunes Hip Hop/Rap charts and number 41 on the iTunes Music charts. The single debuted at number 39 on the UK Singles Chart.
At a sold-out panel discussion on the African diaspora and its relation to music, sponsored by National Geographic, Damian and Stephen Marley and Nas were among the several hip-hop and reggae musicians voicing their solidarity. The discussion focused on the collaborations between artists of the two genres, and highlighted the Distant Relatives project.

SuperHeavy (2011–2015)
The existence of SuperHeavy was secret until May 2011. Mick Jagger, English musician and the lead vocalist of rock band The Rolling Stones, announced its formation on 20 May 2011. SuperHeavy was Dave Stewart's idea. Inspired by the sounds washing into his home in Saint Ann's Bay, Jamaica, Stewart urged Jagger to fuse their sound with that of Indian orchestras. Stewart and Jagger had mutual liking for Indian orchestrations; thus, A. R. Rahman was added to the supergroup, as well as British singer Joss Stone. The name of the band is said to be inspired by Muhammad Ali.
The group began recording their self-titled debut album in early 2009 at a studio in Los Angeles. They recorded about 35 hours of music. The album was previewed at Jim Henson Studios, Los Angeles, on 30 June 2011. The band played eight of the recorded songs at the event.

"Miracle Worker" was released on iTunes as the album's lead single on 7 July 2011. It is a reggae song performed by Marley, Stone and Jagger. The single entered at number 195 on the UK Singles Chart. The music video was released on YouTube on 12 August 2011. Directed by Stewart and filmed at Paramount Studios in Los Angeles, the video features all five members of the band.
"Satyameva Jayathe" (the national motto of India, which literally translates as "Truth Alone Triumphs") was released as the second single from the album on 9 August 2011, a week before India's Independence Day on 15 August. Composed by Rahman to have an Indian feel, Jagger sings in Sanskrit on the song, which also features Stewart, Stone and Marley. The song premiered exclusively on Radio Mirchi 98.3 FM on 9 August across twenty-two Indian cities, and Tata DoCoMo is set to simultaneously promote the song and the album on mass media.
"Beautiful People" reached number 64 on the Dutch Single Top 100 chart.

Damian also worked with electronic artist Skrillex on a song called "Make It Bun Dem" in 2012. This song also appears in the 2012 game Far Cry 3. Affairs of the Heart was a massive hit in Jamaica, topping the reggae charts.

Stony Hill (2017–present)
Damian Marley released his fourth studio album, Stony Hill, in July 2017. Its first single "Nail Pon Cross" was released in August 2016. The album won the Grammy Award for Best Reggae Album at the 60th Annual Grammy Awards.

Musical style
Marley has described his music as "dancehall and reggae. I've noticed ... people trying to separate the two of them," he continues. "It's Jamaican culture in general. I don't try to classify or separate."
Distant Relatives fused hip hop and reggae musical elements, Marley and Nas also incorporated samples from African music into the album. The album's lyrical content heavily revolves around themes concerning Africa, from ancestry and poverty, with social commentary of the United States and Africa. The track "Count Your Blessings" reflects on the plight of Africa.

Discography

Studio albums

Collaborative releases

Singles

Other charted songs

References

External links

 
 
Damian Marley on Myspace

Jamaican Rastafarians
Jamaican reggae musicians
Jamaican reggae singers
Jamaican people of Canadian descent
Jamaican_people_of_English_descent
Motown artists
Grammy Award winners
People from Kingston, Jamaica
Reggae fusion artists
D
1978 births
Living people
Musicians from Kingston, Jamaica
SuperHeavy members
21st-century Jamaican male singers